Joseph-Arthur Denis (26 April 1881 – 1 October 1934) was a Liberal party member of the House of Commons of Canada. He was born in Saint-Norbert, Quebec in Berthier County and became a physician.

The son of Arsène Denis and Georgiana Laporte, Denis attended Joliette College, then Université Laval. He practised medicine at Notre-Dame-des-Bois and Montreal.

He was first elected to Parliament at the St. Denis riding in the 1921 general election then re-elected in
1925, 1926 and 1930. Denis died on 1 October 1934 before he was able to complete his fourth term, the 17th Canadian Parliament. His brother Azellus succeeded him as member for St. Denis.

References

External links
 

1881 births
1934 deaths
Physicians from Quebec
Liberal Party of Canada MPs
Members of the House of Commons of Canada from Quebec
Université Laval alumni